The Sangu River is a river in Myanmar and Bangladesh. Its source is in the North Arakan Hills of Myanmar, located at 21°13´N 92°37´E. The Arakan Hills form the boundary between Arakan and the Chittagong Hill Tracts. It follows a northerly circuitous course in the hill tracts and then enters Bangladesh near Remaikri, Thanchi Upazila, Bandarban District, from the east. It flows north through Thanchi, Rowangchhari and Bandarban Sadar Upazilas of Bandarban District.

The major tributaries of the river are the Chand Khali Nadi and Dolukhal. The Chand Khali Nadi flows through the Patiya Plains, and the Dolukhal River drains into the Satkania Plains. Another tributary is the Kumira Khali, which drains into the Kutubdia Channel. There are seven Bangladesh Water Management Board hydrometric stations on this river, which have been recording data since 1965.

The Sangu drains off the waters of Patiya, Satkania, and Banshkhali Upazilas. It has a connection with the Karnafuli River through the Chand Khali River. The Sangu is a shallow river, but it becomes violent during rains and develops rapid currents.

External links

 Sangu Matamuhari

Banshkhali Upazila
Rivers of Bangladesh
Rivers of Chittagong Division
Satkania Upazila